New Holland may refer to:

Places and jurisdictions 
Dutch colonial claims
 New Holland (Acadia), 1670s claim in northeastern North America
 New Holland (Australia), 17th- to 19th-century name for the continent of Australia
 Apostolic Prefecture of New Holland, 1816–1819 Roman Catholic missionary jurisdiction
 Apostolic Vicariate of New Holland and Van Diemen's Land, 1834–1842 Roman Catholic missionary jurisdiction
 New Holland (Brazil), 17th-century Dutch West India Company territories on the northeast coast of Brazil

Places in the United States
 New Holland, Georgia
 New Holland, Illinois
 New Holland, Ohio
 New Holland, North Carolina
 New Holland, Pennsylvania
 New Holland, South Dakota

Places elsewhere
 New Holland, Saint Elizabeth, Jamaica
 New Holland Island, Saint Petersburg, Russia
 New Holland, Lincolnshire, United Kingdom

Companies 
 New Holland Agriculture, brand of agricultural machinery of CNH, part of the Italian Fiat group
 New Holland Construction, brand of construction equipment of CNH, part of the Italian Fiat group
 New Holland Machine Company, a predecessor of New Holland Agriculture and New Holland Construction
 New Holland Brewing Company of Holland, Michigan, United States
 New Holland Publishers,  an International book and map publisher with a head office in South Africa and offices in the United Kingdom, Australia and New Zealand

Other 
 New Holland (band), a band from South Africa
 The Flag of New Holland
 New Holland honeyeater (Phylidonyris novaehollandiae), a bird of southern Australia
 New Holland mouse (Pseudomys novaehollandiae), found in southeastern Australia
 New Holland seahorse (Hippocampus whitei), found in the southwest Pacific ocean
 New Holland frog (Cyclorana novaehollandiae), found in east Queensland

See also 
 Dutch Brazil
 Holland (disambiguation)
 New Netherland